Muzaffarbek Turoboyev (born 5 April 2000) is an Uzbekistani judoka.

He won the gold medal at the 2022 World Judo Championships and a bronze medal at the 2021 World Judo Championships.

References

External links
 
 
 

2000 births
Living people
Uzbekistani male judoka
21st-century Uzbekistani people